Melanopsis rifi is a minute species of freshwater gastropod in the family Melanopsidae, endemic to a small spring in the south-eastern Rich region of Morocco.

References
 

Melanopsidae
Endemic fauna of Morocco
Gastropods described in 2014